Ecos de mi tierra is an Argentine TV program focused on Argentine folk music.

Awards
 2015 Martín Fierro Awards
 Best musical program

References

Televisión Pública original programming
2008 Argentine television series debuts